Portland is a community located west of Freeport, Florida and east of Basin Bayou and the former settlement of Pensarosa.

The Portland Community Center is commonly used as a voting location for Precinct 420 of Walton County.

References 

Geography of Walton County, Florida